Bishopdale is a residential suburb located in the north of Christchurch, New Zealand.

Bishopdale lies close to Christchurch International Airport at Harewood and Christchurch's zoo, Orana Wildlife Park.

History
The suburb takes its name from the three Bishop brothers, James (1826–1910), Robert (1827–1909) and William (1829–1903), who bought land in the area in 1858 or 1859 and established pipfruit orchards.  Initially, the area was called "Bishopsdale", but the second 's' was dropped from the name. Part of Greers Road (the section between Harewood Road and Sawyers Arms Road) was formerly called Bishop's Road.  It was renamed in 1948 to avoid confusion with Bishops Road in Papanui and Bishop Street in St Albans.

Bishopdale is overall a middle-class suburb, with a wide range of people living in the area. Most of the houses date from the 1960s, and use either brick or wood, single-storey designs.  The area boasts a lot of parks and recreational areas, and a small shopping mall.

Demographics

Bishopdale had a population of 9,306 at the 2018 New Zealand census, an increase of 249 people (2.7%) since the 2013 census, and an increase of 354 people (4.0%) since the 2006 census. There were 3,504 households. There were 4,569 males and 4,734 females, giving a sex ratio of 0.97 males per female, with 1,788 people (19.2%) aged under 15 years, 1,839 (19.8%) aged 15 to 29, 4,092 (44.0%) aged 30 to 64, and 1,590 (17.1%) aged 65 or older.

Ethnicities were 79.8% European/Pākehā, 8.9% Māori, 4.3% Pacific peoples, 13.1% Asian, and 2.8% other ethnicities (totals add to more than 100% since people could identify with multiple ethnicities).

The proportion of people born overseas was 22.9%, compared with 27.1% nationally.

Although some people objected to giving their religion, 49.9% had no religion, 38.3% were Christian, 0.8% were Hindu, 0.9% were Muslim, 1.0% were Buddhist and 2.2% had other religions.

Of those at least 15 years old, 1,575 (20.9%) people had a bachelor or higher degree, and 1,425 (19.0%) people had no formal qualifications. The employment status of those at least 15 was that 3,795 (50.5%) people were employed full-time, 1,116 (14.8%) were part-time, and 249 (3.3%) were unemployed.

Economy

Retail

Bishopdale Village Mall was established in Bishopdale in the 1960s. It has 600 carparks and 80 retailers, including a New World supermarket.

Education
Breens Intermediate is an intermediate school catering for years 7 to 8. The school, initially named Fendalton Intermediate, opened in 1976.

Bishopdale School, Cotswold School and Isleworth School are contributing primary schools catering for years 1 to 6. Bishopdale School opened in 1957, Cotswold in 1968 and Isleworth in 1962.

Emmanuel Christian School is a state-integrated interdenominational school for years 1 to 10.

All these schools are coeducational, and all except Emmanuel Christian School are state schools. Rolls are as of

Religion

Bishopdale has a library and many churches, including Presbyterian, Jehovah's Witnesses and Catholic.

In popular culture
Margaret Mahy has set her book The Changeover in Bishopdale; it is called Gardendale in that popular book, and production of a film of the same name began in 2016.

References

Suburbs of Christchurch